Philip Melville (11 August 1904 – 1 February 1974) was a South African cricketer. He played in one first-class match for Border in 1926/27.

See also
 List of Border representative cricketers

References

External links
 

1904 births
1974 deaths
South African cricketers
Border cricketers
Cricketers from Edinburgh